Cossus is a genus of moths in the family Cossidae described by Johan Christian Fabricius in 1793.

Species
 Cossus afghanistana Daniel, 1953
 Cossus bohatschi Püngeler, 1898
 Cossus cossus Linnaeus, 1758
 Cossus crassicornis Fabricius, 1775
 Cossus dentilinea Druce, 1911
 Cossus hoenei Yakovlev, 2006
 Cossus horrifer Schaus, 1892
 Cossus inconspicuus Druce, 1910
 Cossus kerzhneri Yakovlev, 2011
 Cossus nina Schaus, 1911
 Cossus orientalis Gaede, 1929
 Cossus shmakovi Yakovlev, 2004
 Cossus siniaevi Yakovlev, 2004
 Cossus subocellatus Walker, 1856
 Cossus tibetanus Hua, Chou, Fang & Chen, 1990
 Cossus ziliante Stoll, 1782

Former species
 Cossus abyssinicus Hampson, 1910
 Cossus acronyctoides Moore, 1879
 Cossus aegyptiacus Hampson, 1910
 Cossus airani Daniel, 1937
 Cossus aksuensis Daniel, 1953
 Cossus araraticus Teich, 1896
 Cossus aries Püngeler, 1902
 Cossus badiala D. S. Fletcher, 1968
 Cossus balcanicus Lederer, 1863
 Cossus bianchii Krüger, 1934
 Cossus bongiovannii Krüger, 1939
 Cossus breviculus Mabille, 1880
 Cossus brunneofasciatus Gaede, 1929
 Cossus cadambae Moore, 1865
 Cossus cashmirensis Moore, 1879
 Cossus celebensis Roepke, 1957
 Cossus centerensis Lintner, 1877
 Cossus centrimaculatus Röber, 1925
 Cossus cheesmani Tams, 1925
 Cossus chloratus Swinhoe, 1892
 Cossus cinereus Roepke, 1957
 Cossus cirrilator Le Cerf, 1919
 Cossus colossus Staudinger, 1887
 Cossus crassilineatus Gaede, 1929
 Cossus crucis Kenrick, 1914
 Cossus divisus Rothschild, 1912
 Cossus eutelia Clench, 1959
 Cossus fanti Hampson, 1910
 Cossus frater Warnecke, 1929
 Cossus fulvosparsa Butler, 1882
 Cossus funkei Röber, 1896
 Cossus fuscibasis Hampson, 1895
 Cossus gaerdesi Daniel, 1956
 Cossus giganteus Schwingenschuss, 1938
 Cossus greeni Arora, 1976
 Cossus hunanensis Daniel, 1940
 Cossus hycranus Christoph, 1888
 Cossus incandescens Butler, 1875
 Cossus javanus Roepke, 1957
 Cossus kinabaluensis Gaede, 1933
 Cossus kwouus Karsch, 1898
 Cossus lepta West, 1932
 Cossus likiangi Daniel, 1940
 Cossus mauretanicus D. Lucas, 1907
 Cossus modestus Staudinger, 1887
 Cossus mokshanensis Daniel, 1949
 Cossus mongolicus Erschoff, 1882
 Cossus mucidus Edwards, 1882
 Cossus nigeriae Bethune-Baker, 1915
 Cossus nigromaculatus Hampson, 1892
 Cossus osthelderi Daniel, 1933
 Cossus parvipunctatus Hampson, 1892
 Cossus parvulus Kenrick, 1914
 Cossus pavidus Butler, 1882
 Cossus perplexus Neumoegen, 1893
 Cossus polygraphus Lower, 1893
 Cossus populi Walker, 1865
 Cossus pusillus Roepke, 1957
 Cossus rectangulatus Wichgraf, 1921
 Cossus reussi Strand, 1913
 Cossus rufidorsia Hampson, 1905
 Cossus saharae D. Lucas, 1907
 Cossus sakalava Viette, 1958
 Cossus sareptensis Rothschild, 1912
 Cossus semicurvatus Gaede, 1929
 Cossus seineri Grünberg
 Cossus senex Butler, 1882
 Cossus sidamo Rougeot, 1977
 Cossus stertzi Püngeler, 1900
 Cossus stigmaticus Moore, 1879
 Cossus striolatus Rothschild, 1912
 Cossus subfuscus Snellen, 1895
 Cossus tahamae Wiltshire, 1949
 Cossus tahlai Dumont, 1932
 Cossus tapinus Püngeler, 1898
 Cossus terebroides Felder, 1874
 Cossus toluminus Druce, 1887
 Cossus turati Krüger, 1934
 Cossus unguiculatus Fabricius, 1793
 Cossus verbeeki Roepke, 1957
 Cossus vinctus Walker, 1865
 Cossus windhoekensis Strand, 1913

Unknown status
 Cossus florita Druce

References

 , 1937: Zwei neue Cossidae aus Persien. Mitteilungen der Münchner Entomologischen Gesellschaft 27: 49-51. Full article: .
 , 1940: Die Cossidae und Hepialidae der Ausbeuten Hone. Mitteilungen der Münchner Entomologischen Gesellschaft 30: 1004–1020. Full article: 
 , 1990: A Phylogenetic study on Cossidae (Lepidoptera: Ditrysia) based on external adult morphology. Zoologische Verhandelingen 263: 1–295. Full article: .
 , 2004: New data about Carpenter Moths of China (Lepidoptera: Cossidae). Atalanta 35 (3/4): 353–356.
 , 2004: Carpenter-Moths (Lepidoptera: Cossidae) of Mongolia. Euroasian Entomological Journal 3 (3): 217–224.
 , 2006, New Cossidae (Lepidoptera) from Asia, Africa and Macronesia, Tinea 19 (3): 188–213.
 , 2009: Systematic review of Goat Moth – Cossus cossus (Linnaeus, 1758) (Lepidoptera, Cossidae). Amurian Zoological Journal I (1): 57–71. Full article: .

External links

 
Moth genera